The Shore Institute of the Contemporary Arts (SICA) was a non-profit arts center in Asbury Park, New Jersey.  It was previously located in Long Branch, New Jersey, United States, located in the former Lincon Can Manufacturing building.

Founded in 2000, the physical institute was officially opened in 2004. SICA had a gallery, a cafe, artists studios and classrooms. The cafe hosted local bands, film screenings, meetings and performances. SICA offered artists instruction and speakers as well as yoga classes. They also held the yearly ArtX performance event.

The Institute has closed as of December 2012.

References 

Contemporary art galleries in the United States
Former buildings and structures in New Jersey
Arts centers in New Jersey
Arts organizations based in New Jersey
Defunct museums in New Jersey
Tourist attractions in Monmouth County, New Jersey
Long Branch, New Jersey
Asbury Park, New Jersey
Arts organizations established in 2000
Arts organizations disestablished in 2012
2000 establishments in New Jersey
2012 disestablishments in New Jersey